Kay Lorraine is a former professional singer and film producer.  She later worked for 20 years with nonprofit agencies in Hawaii, and graduated from law school at age 70.  At age 75, she earned a legal Masters in Dispute Resolution from Pepperdine University.  Her work centers around justice for children.

Career
Lorraine worked as President and Executive Producer at Major League Productions, a film production company and as CEO and Executive Director at a number of Hawaii non-profit agencies. Groups with which she was involved include Hawaii Women Lawyers, Hawaii Women's Legal Foundation, Hawaii Women's Business Center, Research Institute for Hawaii, Rascal Learning Network and CCIM. Her efforts at the Innocence Project helped young women who were incarcerated.  In 2018, she took a leave of absence from Greg Ryan & Associates law firm to fly to Texas, where she spent 8 months working pro bono at the border finding and reuniting immigrant children with their families.

Lorraine graduated summa cum laude with a BA in Public Policy, and then completed a Juris Doctor from University of Hawaii's Richardson School of Law. When she received it in 2017 at age 70, she became the oldest law student to graduate from that school.

Harassment case
In 2014, the Hawaii Civil Rights Commission found that Lorraine, as a Jewish woman, had been the victim of religious and sexual discrimination in a hostile work environment at her 2004-2007 workplace, the Research Institute for Hawaii, USA. The commission held the institute and its founder, Christopher Damon Haig, liable and awarded her $843,200. Grounds for the decision included Haig's calling Lorraine a "Jewish seductress enticing him to sign her invoices" and his references to her "subversive Hebrew intent" and her "Hebrew foot shuffling to steal other people's intelligence." The commission considered Haig's conduct pervasive and severe. Despite emotional breakdowns, Lorraine had remained on the job because it provided the bulk of her household's income. The commission noted that she complained about Haig's comments to a member of the institute's board and received the reply "That's just Christopher being Christopher". The compensation included damages and back pay.

Personal life 
Lorraine had a longtime singing career, starting at four-years old when she and her mother were the warmup act at state fairs for popular singer Tennessee Ernie Ford.  Later Lorraine sang with Mel Tormé through the 1970s and then with the Ike Cole Trio (brother of Nat King Cole).  She also sang television and radio jingles.  After leaving the stage, she became a film producer and, later, a non-profit executive.  In 1994, she moved to Hawaii with her longtime husband, Brad Bate.

References 

Year of birth missing (living people)
University of Hawaiʻi alumni
Living people